Ravin’ was a 1970s Canadian jazz-funk band that had a half an LP release on CBC Records and won the first Q107 homegrown contest.

Performing regularly at the El Mocambo and the Isabella Tavern in Toronto, Ontario, Ravin’ achieved moderate success and helped perpetuate the careers of many of its members. Parts of their performance also included Latin-funk overtones, as exhibited on the Rick Morrison/Santana track "Aruba/Europa".

Marty Morell has gone on to have a highly prolific jazz-based career. Jack Lenz is one of Canada’s top television and film composers and has written original songs for Andrea Bocelli, Nanalan', The Grogs, Little Mosque On The Prairie, Due South and Men With Brooms.

Rich (Rick) Morrison, a featured performer on April Wine's album, "On Record", has recorded and performed with Martha Reeves, Long John Baldry, Roger Whittaker, The Good Brothers, Teenage Head, Rupert "Ojiji" Harvey’’ of Messenjah, THP Orchestra, The Band, The Sattalites, and Ronnie Hawkins.

Vocalist Wayne St. John (Wayne Alan Richardson), who besides having an extensive solo career and being entered into the Black Canadian Music Hall of Fame (1982), sang lead vocals for Ocean (band), Domenic Troiano band, Dr. Music (with Doug Riley and Don Thompson), THP Orchestra, Motherlode,  Dr. Lonnie Smith and performed on the single “Tears Are Not Enough” – which was recorded by a Canadian super-group to raise money and awareness for the 1983-84 Ethiopia famine. He was nominated for a Juno Award in 1977.  He later created about 1,000 jingles for various companies and commercial products. St. John is the father of actress Michelle St. John (Michelle L. Richardson).

Hugh Brockie was one of Ronnie Hawkins’ “Hawks” and a founding member of Bearfoot and Skylark.

Album line-up
Rich Morrison: Saxophones, Vocals
Hugh Brockie: Guitar, Vocals
Peter Jeffrey: Trumpet, Flute
Dave James: Drums
Peter Elias: Bass
Jack Lenz: Keyboards
Wayne St. John: Vocals
Marty Morrell: Congas

Track listing
”Opus #1” – (Hugh Brockie) – 5:19
”Don’t Push It” (Hugh Brockie) – 4:19
”Aruba/Europa” (Rick Morrison/Santana) – 7:05
”Funky Thang” (Rick Morrison) – 4:42

Production
Recorded at Studio 4S, Toronto
Recording Engineers: David Dobbs, Tom Shipton
Producer: Keith Duncan
Remix Engineer: Larry Morey

References

External links
Wayne St. John website
Lenz Entertainment website
Marty Morrell at MySpace

Musical groups with year of establishment missing
Musical groups from Toronto
Canadian jazz ensembles